Sea rewilding (also known as marine rewilding) is an area of environmental conservation activity which focuses on rewilding, restoring ocean life and returning seas to a more natural state. Sea rewilding projects operate around the world, working to repopulate a wide range of organisms, including giant clams, sharks, skates, sea sturgeons, and many other species. Rewilding marine and coastal ecosystems offer potential ways to mitigate climate change and sequester carbon. Sea rewilding projects are currently less common than those focusing on rewilding land, and seas are under increasing stress from the blue economy – commercial activities which further stress the marine environment.

Seagrass 

Seagrass meadows store carbon dioxide. More than 90% of the United Kingdom's historic seagrass meadows have been lost. Restoring meadows could offset carbon emissions and  provide habitat for numerous fish and shellfish species.  Research into seagrass, which covers about one percent of the sea floor suggests that it may be delivering 15–18% of carbon storage in the ocean. Meadows have been declining since the 1930s and are being lost at an alarming rate. Due to their scarcity they have been designated a UK habitat of principal importance. In the United States, a project at Chesapeake Bay is considered a success.

Native oysters 

Oysters filter water, recycle nutrients and help to protect against coastal erosion. Oyster stocks have declined by 95 per cent in Europe due to over-harvesting, habitat loss, pollution and disease.

In Rhode Island, US, "wild oyster populations are at an all-time low", according to Eric Schneider, the principal marine biologist with the Rhode Island Department of Environmental Management's Division of Marine Fisheries. He also states: "oysters provide a number of essential ecosystem services, from water filtration to fish habitat and shoreline protection. By having oyster reef habitat absent from these systems, those services can be significantly depressed."

It has been demonstrated that restoring historic oyster beds improves water quality.

Kelp forests 

Kelp forests are important habitats which have been lost over time in coastal waters. Kelp forests provide habitat for fish, protect coastlines from erosion and trap carbon dioxide from the ocean. They grow fast and absorb large amounts of carbon. Restoring kelp forests is a strategy to address climate change and enrich ocean livestock.

Marine protected areas 
Marine protected areas are areas protected from certain activity. They are used to preserve and conserve areas where marine life has been disrupted or disturbed. Such disturbances could be overfishing, ocean pollution, and other similar disturbances. 

In Chile, environmental groups such as Rewilding Chile are campaigning to create new protected areas.

Carbon capture 
Rewilding the sea has been described as "the new way to capture carbon".

Organisations 
Seawilding, a Scottish charity work with communities
 NatureScot 
 Rewilding Britain

See also 
Rewilding
Salmon conservation
Blue carbon
Reef burials

Further reading

References 

Environmental protection
Marine conservation
Climate action plans
Ecological restoration
Rewilding
Blue carbon
Natural resources
Aquatic ecology